Oyala Thumotang, formerly Mungkan Kandju National Park (and prior to that Archer Bend National Park), is a national park in Queensland, Australia,  northwest of Brisbane.

History
The Oyala Thumotang National Park encompasses what was formerly the lands of the Wik Mungkan, Southern Kaanju and Ayapathu Aboriginal peoples.
The formation of the original national park was closely linked to the significant court case of Koowarta v Bjelke-Petersen decided in the High Court of Australia.

Location
The park is located in central Cape York Peninsula. It is about 25 km north of Coen. It is 12 hrs by road north of Cairns. The park occupies 381,000 hectares from the McIlwraith Range foothills in the east to the Archer River in the west. The Archer and the Coen rivers flow through the park.

Vegetation
The park has open eucalypt woodlands, melaleuca swamps and areas of rainforest.

Camping
There are 18 camp sites near rivers and waterholes in the park. There is an entry fee. Drinking water is not available in the camping sites, so visitors need to carry their own water.

See also

 Koowarta v Bjelke-Petersen
 Protected areas of Queensland

References

National parks of Far North Queensland
Protected areas established in 1994
1994 establishments in Australia